"TAP" is a 1995 science fiction novelette by Australian writer Greg Egan. It is set in a near-future society in which brain implants allow immersive virtual reality.  The implants also allow a new kind of language called TAP, Total Affective Protocol.  TAP is essentially a way of making qualia into words. 

TAP words can be read like English, or invoked to be experienced, like virtual reality.

Reception
"TAP" was a finalist for the 1996 Hugo Award for Best Novelette.

References

External links
TAP

1995 short stories
Virtual reality in fiction
Science fiction short stories
Short stories by Greg Egan
Works originally published in Asimov's Science Fiction
1990s science fiction works